Otocinclus mariae is a species of catfish in the family Loricariidae. It is native to South America, where it is known from the basins of the Madeira River and the Amazon RIver.  It reaches 3.3 cm (1.3 inches) SL.

References 

Hypoptopomatini
Fish described in 1940